Django/Misty is a studio album by jazz harpist Dorothy Ashby released via the Philips Records label in 1984. The album is named after two famous jazz compositions.

Track listing

Credits
Design – Naoe Arano
Harp – Dorothy Ashby
Illustration – Yōko Ochida

References

External links
A Dorothy Ashby Discography

Dorothy Ashby albums
1984 albums
Philips Records albums